Walter Pöltner (29 February 1952) is an Austrian jurist who formerly served as the designated Minister of Social Affairs.

References 

1952 births
Living people
21st-century Austrian politicians
Austrian jurists
Health ministers of Austria
Politicians from Vienna